The 2018 Paul Hunter Classic was a professional ranking snooker tournament that took place in August 2018 at the Stadthalle in Fürth, Germany. It was the third ranking event of the 2018/2019 season. The tournament is named in honour of former snooker professional, Paul Hunter.

Michael White was the defending champion, however he lost 1–4 to Zhang Anda in the last 32.

Kyren Wilson won his second ranking tournament, beating Peter Ebdon 4–2 in the final after Ebdon had taken a two-frame lead. Ebdon reached his 18th ranking final at the age of 47 a day before his birthday. It was his first ranking final since 2012. He was the oldest player to reach a ranking event final since 48-year-old Steve Davis reached the final of the 2005 UK Championship.

Michael Georgiou made the 140th official maximum break in the third frame of his last 128 match against Umut Dikme. It was Georgiou's first professional maximum break. Later on the same day Jamie Jones made the 141st official maximum break in the third frame of his last 64 match against Lee Walker. It was also Jones' first professional maximum break.

13 year old amateur Ben Mertens made his debut at a professional ranking tournament with a 4–1 win over Adam Stefanow. He then exited the tournament in the second round.

Prize fund

The breakdown of prize money for this year is shown below:
 Winner: £20,000
 Runner up: £10,000
 Semifinals: £4,500
 Quarterfinals: £3,000
 Last 16: £1,725
 Last 32: £1,000
 Last 64: £600
 Total: £100,000

The "rolling 147 prize" for a maximum break stood at £20,000, and was split by both Michael Georgiou, in the last 128 round against Umut Dikme, and Jamie Jones in his last 64 match against Lee Walker. This was both players' first maximum break.

Main rounds
Played from 24 to 26 August 2018. All matches were the best of 7 frames.

Top half

Section 1

Section 2

Section 3

Section 4

Bottom half

Section 5

Section 6

Section 7

Section 8

Finals

Final

Amateur pre-qualifying
These matches were played in Fürth on 22–23 August 2018. All matches were the best of 7 frames.

Round 1

Round 2

Century breaks

Main rounds centuries
Total: 43

 147  Michael Georgiou
 147  Jamie Jones
 144, 125, 116, 104, 101  Chris Wakelin
 143  Thepchaiya Un-Nooh
 141  Jackson Page
 137, 102  Jack Lisowski
 134, 106  Lee Walker
 129  Eden Sharav
 123, 100  Luca Brecel
 120, 111  Kyren Wilson
 115, 103  Liam Highfield
 113, 107  Scott Donaldson
 110  Peter Ebdon
 109, 108, 108  Zhang Yong
 109, 107, 101  Mark Davis
 108  Gary Wilson
 107  Fergal O'Brien
 106, 100  Rod Lawler
 106  Shaun Murphy
 105  Tom Ford
 105  Noppon Saengkham
 104  Harvey Chandler
 104  Kurt Maflin
 102  Peter Lines
 101  Dominic Dale
 101  Andrew Higginson
 101  Jimmy Robertson
 100  Sam Baird

Amateur pre-qualifying centuries
Total: 6

 131, 100  David Grace
 104, 100  Dylan Emery
 102  Charlie Walters
 101  Andrew Pagett

References

2018
2018 in snooker
2018 in German sport
August 2018 sports events in Germany